USS Ibis has been the name of more than one United States Navy ship, and may refer to:

, a minesweeper in commission from 1918 to 1919
, a minesweeper in commission from 1942 to 1944

United States Navy ship names